The Ocean Race is a yacht race around the world, held every three or four years since 1973. Originally named the Whitbread Round the World Race after its initiating sponsor, British brewing company Whitbread, in 2001 it became the Volvo Ocean Race after Swedish automobile manufacturer Volvo took up the sponsorship, and in 2019 it was renamed The Ocean Race.

Though the route changes to accommodate various ports of call, the race typically departs Europe in October, and in recent editions has had either 9 or 10 legs, with in-port races at many of the stopover cities. The most recent race, the 2017–18 Volvo Ocean Race started in Alicante, Spain, and concluded in The Hague, Netherlands, with stopovers in Lisbon, Cape Town, Melbourne, Guangzhou, Hong Kong, Auckland, Itajaí, Newport, Cardiff, and Gothenburg.

Each of the entries has a sailing crew who race day and night for more than 20 days at a time on some of the legs.  Since the 2008–2009 race there has also been a dedicated media crew member called the On Board Reporter (OBR), who does not contribute to the sailing of the boat, but is responsible for sending images and video to race headquarters via satellite from the middle of the ocean. In the 2017–2018 race, the number of crew ranged between 7 and 10 (plus the OBR) depending on the gender ratio, with the rules providing an incentive to having women sailors on board.

To minimize weight, crews overwhelmingly rely on freeze-dried fare for sustenance. Crews are also subjected to temperature variations from −5 to +40 degrees Celsius and will often only take one change of clothes.

History
In 1972 England's Whitbread company and the British Royal Naval Sailing Association agreed to sponsor a globe-circling regatta, which would be called the 'Whitbread Round the World Yacht Race'.

Approximately 3000 spectator boats set out to witness the historic start. The first race was won by Mexican amateur Ramon Carlin in a Swan 65 yacht, Sayula II. Sayula II was followed by Adventure, Grand Louis and Kriter.

The original course was designed to follow the route of the square riggers, which had carried cargo around the world during the 19th Century.

From 2001 the ownership of the race was taken over by Volvo and Volvo Cars and the race was renamed the ‘Volvo Ocean Race’. Stopover ports were added in Germany, France, and Sweden being Volvo's three biggest car markets in Europe.

Winning the race does not attract a cash prize, as the feat of competing is presented as sufficient reward.

Many of the crew in the Volvo Ocean Race race crew other professional teams in other high-profile events, such as the Olympic Games, Sydney to Hobart Yacht Race, the America's Cup, or the Fastnet Race.

The worst weather conditions are usually encountered in the Southern Ocean where waves sometimes top  and winds can reach .

The 2017–18 race covered 45,000 nautical miles, which is the longest route in its history.

The yachts
Early races had a very wide range of boat types, but concerns after the 1989–1990 race led to the development of the Whitbread 60 single design. This was a reaction to increasing costs of the biggest, "maxi", boats, and their advantage over the rest of the field – Steinlager 2 won every leg in the maxi division and was the winner overall, with many of the smaller boats finishing legs more than ten days after the winner.

The Whitbread 60 design was used for all smaller boats in the 1993–1994 race, and for all in the 1997–1998 race. The race continued to be restricted to a single class for the next seven races – but moved to the Volvo Open 70, then the Volvo Ocean 65.

Two classes of boats will be used for the 2021–22 edition of the race: the Volvo Ocean 65 and the IMOCA 60, an advanced open class normally raced two-handed.

The route
Though the route changes to accommodate various ports of call, the race typically departs Europe in October, and in recent editions has had either 9 or 10 legs, with in-port races at many of the stopover cities. The 2008–09 race started in Alicante, Spain, on October 11, 2008. The route for the 2008–2009 race was altered from previous years to include stopovers in India and Asia for the first time.

As in the previous editions the 2014–15 Volvo Ocean Race started in Alicante, Spain on October 11. Destination was Gothenburg, Sweden, scheduled for June 2015, with stopovers in the ports of Cape Town, Abu Dhabi, Sanya, Auckland, Itajaí, Newport, Lisbon, Lorient, and with a Pitstop at The Hague through the last leg.

List of races

Notable records
 Netherlands, only country to have three wins
 Conny van Rietschoten, only skipper to win the race twice
 Steinlager 2, only yacht to ever win all six legs
 Maiden, first all-female team, skippered by Tracy Edwards

Horrevoets Trophy
In May 2009, The Ocean Race launched the Hans Horrevoets Rookie Award to recognize the outstanding under-30 sailor in each edition of the Race as nominated by the respective skippers.

Recipients:

 2008-09 - Michael "Michi" Mueller - Puma Ocean Racing.
 2011-12 - David "Dave" Swete - Team Sanya.
 2014-15 - Sophie Ciszek - Team SCA.
 2017-18 - Bleddyn Mon - Turn the Tide on Plastic.

See also

 List of Volvo Ocean Race sailors

References

Further reading
 Danger on the high seas – whales, debris and weather just some of the obstacles in the Volvo Ocean Race –  Steve Elling, The National, 9 October 2014

External links

Recurring sporting events established in 1973
 
Whitbread